Peter Stephens (born 21 June 1950) is a former Australian rules footballer who played with Geelong in the Victorian Football League (VFL).

Stephens, who was recruited from New South Wales, was a ruckman, also used as a forward during his three seasons at Geelong.

He captained Geelong West to a 28-point grand final win over Dandenong in 1975, the club's sole VFA first-division premiership.

References

1950 births
Australian rules footballers from New South Wales
Geelong Football Club players
Geelong West Football Club players
Living people